Krige may refer to the following people:
 Krige (surname), a surname, common in South Africa
 Alice Krige (born 1954), actress best known for her role in the Star Trek series as the Borg Queen
 Danie G. Krige (born 1919), South African mining engineer who pioneered the field of geostatistics
 Corné Krige (born 1975), South African rugby union footballer
 Uys Krige (1910–1987), South African writer, poet, playwright, translator, rugby player, war correspondent and romantic
 John Krige, an historian of science and technology and the Kranzberg Professor at the School of History, Technology and Society, Georgia Institute of Technology, Atlanta

See also 
 Kriging, a geostatistical method of interpolation, named after Danie Krige